Calcium hexaboride (sometimes calcium boride) is a compound of calcium and boron with the chemical formula CaB6. It is an important material due to its high electrical conductivity, hardness, chemical stability, and melting point. It is a black, lustrous, chemically inert powder with a low density. It has the cubic structure typical for metal hexaborides, with octahedral units of 6 boron atoms combined with calcium atoms. CaB6 and lanthanum-doped CaB6 both show weak ferromagnetic properties, which is a remarkable fact because calcium and boron are neither magnetic, nor have inner 3d or 4f electronic shells, which are usually required for ferromagnetism.

Properties 
CaB6 has been investigated in the past due to a variety of peculiar physical properties, such as superconductivity, valence fluctuation and Kondo effects. However, the most remarkable property of CaB6 is its ferromagnetism. The origin of this high temperature ferromagnetism is the ferromagnetic phase of a dilute electron gas, linkage to the presumed excitonic state in calcium boride, or external impurities on the surface of the sample. The impurities might include iron and nickel, probably coming from impurities in the boron used to prepare the sample.

CaB6 is insoluble in H2O, MeOH (methanol), and EtOH (ethanol) and dissolves slowly in acids. Its microhardness is 27 GPa, Knoop hardness is 2600 kg/mm2), Young modulus is 379 GPa, and electrical resistivity is greater than 2·1010 Ω·m for pure crystals. CaB6 is a semiconductor with an energy gap estimated as 1.0 eV. The low, semi-metallic conductivity of many CaB6 samples can be explained by unintentional doping due to impurities and possible non-stoichiometry.

Structural information
The crystal structure of calcium hexaboride is a cubic lattice with calcium at the cell centre and compact, regular octahedra of boron atoms linked at the vertices by B-B bonds to give a three-dimensional boron network. Each calcium has 24 nearest-neighbor boron atoms The calcium atoms are arranged in simple cubic packing so that there are holes between groups of eight calcium atoms situated at the vertices of a cube. The simple cubic structure is expanded by the introduction of the octahedral B6 groups and the structure is a CsCl-like packing of the calcium and hexaboride groups. Another way of describing calcium hexaboride is as having a metal and a B62− octahedral polymeric anions in a CsCl-type structure where the Calcium atoms occupy the Cs sites and the B6 octahedra in the Cl sites. The Ca-B bond length is 3.05 Å and the B-B bond length is 1.7 Å.

43Ca NMR data contains δpeak at -56.0 ppm and δiso at -41.3 ppm where δiso is taken as peak max +0.85 width, the negative shift is due to the high coordination number.

Raman Data: Calcium hexaboride has three Raman peaks at 754.3, 1121.8, and 1246.9 cm−1 due to the active modes A1g, Eg, and T2g respectively.

Observed Vibrational Frequencies cm−1 : 1270(strong) from A1g stretch, 1154 (med.) and 1125(shoulder) from Eg stretch, 526, 520, 485, and 470 from F1g rotation, 775 (strong) and 762 (shoulder) from F2g bend, 1125 (strong) and 1095 (weak) from F1u bend, 330 and 250 from F1u translation, and 880 (med.) and 779 from F2u bend.

Preparation 
One of the main reactions for industrial production is:
CaO + 3 B2O3 + 10 Mg → CaB6 + 10 MgO

Other methods of producing CaB6 powder include:
Direct reaction of calcium or calcium oxide and boron at 1000 °C;
Ca + 6B → CaB6

Reacting Ca(OH)2 with boron in vacuum at about 1700 °C (carbothermal reduction);
Ca(OH)2 +7B → CaB6 + BO(g) + H2O(g)

Reacting calcium carbonate with boron carbide in vacuum at above 1400 °C (carbothermal reduction)
Reacting of CaO and H3BO3 and Mg to 1100 °C.
Low-temperature (500 °C) synthesis
CaCl2 + 6NaBH4 → CaB6 + 2NaCl + 12H2 + 4Na
results in relatively poor quality material.

 To produce pure CaB6 single crystals, e.g., for use as cathode material, the thus obtained CaB6 powder is further recrystallized and purified with the zone melting technique. The typical growth rate is 30 cm/h and crystal size ~1x10 cm.
Single-crystal CaB6 Nanowires (diameter 15–40 nm, length 1–10 micrometres) can be obtained by pyrolysis of diborane (B2H6) over calcium oxide (CaO) powders at 860–900 °C, in presence of Ni catalyst.

Uses 
Calcium hexaboride is used in the manufacturing of boron-alloyed steel and as a deoxidation agent in production of oxygen-free copper. The latter results in higher conductivity than conventionally phosphorus-deoxidized copper owing to the low solubility of boron in copper. CaB6 can also serve as a high temperature material, surface protection, abrasives, tools, and wear resistant material.

CaB6 is highly conductive, has low work function, and thus can be used as a hot cathode material. When used at elevated temperature, calcium hexaboride will oxidize degrading its properties and shortening its usable lifespan.

CaB6 is also a promising candidate for n-type thermoelectric materials, because its power factor is larger than or comparable to that of common thermoelectric materials Bi2Te3 and PbTe.

CaB also can be used as an antioxidant in carbon bonded refractories.

Precautions 
Calcium hexaboride is irritating to the eyes, skin, and respiratory system. This product should be handled with proper protective eyeware and clothing. Never put calcium hexaboride down the drain or add water to it.

See also
 Boride
 Calcium

References

Further reading 

Borides
Calcium compounds
Deoxidizers
Non-stoichiometric compounds